The Asia-Pacific Council of American Chambers of Commerce (APCAC) was formed in 1968. APCAC represents 50,000 business executives, 20,000 organizations in 22 countries within the Asia-Pacific region.

Through 28 member chambers, APCAC represents the growing interests of over 50,000 business executives and over 10,000 business entities in 20 countries of the Asia-Pacific region. The APCAC membership manages trade volumes in excess of US$400 billion and direct investments (FDI) of over US$200 billion.

In 2019, APCAC officially changed its name to AmCham's of Asia Pacific (AAP).

External links
 www.apcac.org - Official APCAC website
 American Chamber of Commerce in Singapore
 American Chamber of Commerce in Hong Kong
 American Chamber of Commerce in China
 American Chamber of Commerce in India
 American Chamber of Commerce in Thailand
 American Chamber of Commerce in Cambodia
 American Chamber of Commerce in Malaysia
 American Chamber of Commerce in Vietnam - The American Chamber of Commerce in Vietnam
 American Chamber of Commerce in Vietnam, Hanoi
 American Chamber of Commerce, Philippines

International business organizations
Chambers of commerce
International organizations based in Asia